Musical languages are constructed languages based on musical sounds, which tend to incorporate articulation.  Unlike tonal languages, focused on stress, and whistled languages, focused on pitch bends, musical languages distinguish pitches or rhythms.  Whistled languages are dependent on an underlying spoken languages and are used in various cultures as a means for communication over distance, or as secret codes.  The mystical concept of a language of the birds tries to connect the two categories, since some authors of musical a priori languages have speculated about a mystical or primeval origin of the whistled languages.

Constructed musical languages
There are only a few language families as of now such as the Solresol language family, Moss language family, and Nibuzigu language family. 

The Solresol family is a family of a posteriori languages (usually English) where a sequence of 7 notes of the western C-Major scale or the 12 tone chromatic scale are used as phonemes.
Domila
Eaiea
Sarus
Solresol

Moss (language) is a pidgin built out of melodic shapes.

The Nibuzigu family 

Kobaïan is a language constructed by Christian Vander of the band Magma, which uses elements of Slavic and Germanic languages, but is based primarily on 'sonorities, not on applied meanings'.

Musically influenced languages
Hymmnos

In fiction
 Voyage to Faremido

In Film and other Media
 Close Encounters of the Third Kind

See also
Tonal language
Whistled language

References

External links
"Domila" at forum.unilang.org/viewtopic.php?t=30169
Koestner Bruce. "Eaiea". eaiea.com BizHosting.